"Plan A" is a song by American rock band The Dandy Warhols. It was released as the third single from their fourth studio album, Welcome to the Monkey House, on 24 November 2003. It peaked at No. 66 on the UK Singles Chart.

Track listing 

 7" vinyl

 "Plan A"
 "The Jean Genie"

References

External links 

 

2003 singles
The Dandy Warhols songs
2003 songs
Songs written by Courtney Taylor-Taylor
Capitol Records singles